The Greater Tokyo Area is the most populous metropolitan area in the world, consisting of the Kantō region of Japan (including Tokyo Metropolis and the prefectures of Chiba, Gunma, Ibaraki, Kanagawa, Saitama, and Tochigi) as well as the prefecture of Yamanashi of the neighboring Chūbu region. In Japanese, it is referred to by various terms, one of the most common being .

As of 2016, the United Nations estimates the total population at 38,140,000. It covers an area of approximately 13,500 km2 (5,200 mi2), giving it a population density of 2,642 people/km2. It is the second largest single metropolitan area in the world in terms of built-up or urban function landmass at 8,547 km2 (3,300 mi2), behind only the New York City metropolitan area at 11,642 km2 (4,495 mi2).

Definition

There are various definitions of the Greater Tokyo Area, each of which tries to incorporate different aspects.  Some definitions are clearly defined by law or government regulation, some are based coarsely on administrative areas, while others are for research purposes such as commuting patterns or distance from Central Tokyo. Each definition has a different population figure, granularity, methodology, and spatial association.

Various definitions of Tokyo, Greater Tokyo, and Kantō

Notes and sources: All figures issued by Japan Statistics Bureau, except for Metro Employment Area, a study by Center for Spatial Information Service, the University of Tokyo. Abbreviations: CF for National Census Final Data (every 5 years by JSB), CR for Civil Registry (compiled by local governments, monthly as per legal requirement), CP for Census Preliminary.

National Capital Region

The government ordinance defined it as Tokyo and all six prefectures in the Kantō region plus Yamanashi Prefecture. While this includes all of Greater Tokyo, it also includes sparsely populated mountain areas as well as the far-flung Bonin Islands which are administered under Tokyo.

International comparison
Other metropolitan areas such as Greater Jakarta are considerably more compact as well as more densely populated than Greater Tokyo.

Metropolitan Area definition ambiguities and issues
The  is a potentially ambiguous term. Informally, it may mean the One Metropolis, Two Prefectures, or the area without Saitama Prefecture. Formally, it may mean the South Kantō Block, which is not the Greater Tokyo Area, but a proportional representation block of the national election, comprising Kanagawa, Chiba, and Yamanashi Prefectures.
In informal occasions, the term  often means Greater Tokyo Area. Officially, the term refers to a much larger area, namely the whole Kantō region and Yamanashi Prefecture.
Tokyo as a metropolis includes some 394 km of islands (the Izu and Ogasawara islands), as well as some mountainous areas to the far west (331 km), which are officially part of Greater Tokyo, but are wilderness or rustic areas.

Cities
(populations listed for those over 300,000)

Cities within Tokyo
The metropolis is administered by the Tokyo Metropolitan Government as a whole.

Eastern Tokyo Metropolis
Central Tokyo, situated in the eastern portion of Tokyo Metropolis, was once incorporated as Tokyo City, which was dismantled during World War II. The twenty three special wards currently have the legal status of cities, with individual mayors and city councils, and they call themselves "cities" in English. However, when listing Japan's largest cities, Tokyo's twenty three wards are often counted as a single city.

Western Tokyo Metropolis

Western Tokyo, known as the Tama Area (Tama-chiiki 多摩地域) comprises a number of municipalities, including these suburban cities:

Cities outside Tokyo

The core cities of the Greater Tokyo Area outside Tokyo Metropolis are:

Chiba (population 940,000)
Kawasaki (population 1.36 million)
Sagamihara (population 730,000)
Saitama (population 1.19 million)
Yokohama (population 3.62 million)

The other cities in Chiba, Kanagawa and Saitama Prefectures are:

source: stat.go.jp census 2005

Additional cities
In the major metropolitan area (MMA) definition used by the Japanese Statistics Bureau, the following cities in Ibaraki, Tochigi, Gunma, Yamanashi, and Shizuoka Prefectures are included:

Gunma Prefecture
Tatebayashi

Ibaraki Prefecture

Shizuoka Prefecture
Atami

Tochigi Prefecture
Oyama

Yamanashi Prefecture
Ōtsuki
Uenohara

Border areas
If they are included, Greater Tokyo's population would be around 39 million.Takasaki-Maebashi is included as part of the Tokyo-Yokohama area in the definition of urban areas by Demographia.

Geography

At the centre of the main urban area (approximately the first  from Tokyo Station) are the 23 special wards, formerly treated as a single city but now governed as separate municipalities, and containing many major commercial centres such as Shinjuku, Shibuya, Ikebukuro and Ginza. Situated along the loop are the major cities of Yokohama (to the south of Tokyo), Hachiōji (to the west), Ōmiya (now part of Saitama City, to the north), and Chiba (to the east).

Within the Route 16 loop, the coastline of Tokyo Bay is heavily industrialised, with the Keihin Industrial Area stretching from Tokyo down to Yokohama, and the Keiyō Industrial Zone from Tokyo eastwards to Chiba. Along the periphery of the main urban area are numerous new suburban housing developments such as the Tama New Town. The landscape is relatively flat compared to most of Japan, most of it comprising low hills.

Outside the Route 16 loop the landscape becomes more rural. To the southwest is an area known as Shōnan, which contains various cities and towns along the coast of Sagami Bay, and to the west the area is mountainous.

Many rivers run through the area, the major ones being Arakawa and Tama River.

Demographics

Economy
Tokyo metropolitan area has the largest city economy in the world and is one of the major global centers of trade and commerce along with New York City and London.

Greater Tokyo Area 2005

2005 average exchange rate (1 US Dollar = 110.22 Yen)

Source

GDP (purchasing power parity)

The agglomeration of Tokyo is the world's largest economy, with the largest gross metropolitan product at over $2 Trillion  purchasing power parity (PPP) in the world according to a study by PricewaterhouseCoopers.

Metropolitan Employment Area

Sources:, Conversion rates – Exchange rates – OECD Data

Transportation

Air
The Greater Tokyo Area has two major airports, Tokyo International Airport, commonly known as Haneda Airport (once chiefly domestic, now turning international) and Narita International Airport (chiefly international as well). Minor facilities include Chōfu and Ibaraki Airport. Tokyo Heliport serves helicopter traffic, including police, fire, and news. Various military facilities handle air traffic: Naval Air Facility Atsugi (United States Navy and Japan Maritime Self-Defense Force), Yokota Air Base (United States Air Force), and Camp Zama (United States Army).

Rail
Greater Tokyo has an extensive railway network comprising high-speed rail, commuter rails, subways, monorails, private lines, trams and others. There are around 136 individual rail lines in the Greater Tokyo Area, and between 1,000 and 1,200 railway stations depending on one's definition of the area, most designed for heavy use, usually long enough to accommodate 10-car ( long) trains. Stations are designed to accommodate hundreds of thousands of passengers at any given time, with miles of connecting tunnels linking vast department stores and corporate offices. Shinjuku station is used by an average of 3.34 million people per day, making it the world's busiest train station. Some 57 percent of all Greater Tokyo residents used rail as their primary means of transport in 2001.

JR East and many other carriers crisscross the region with a network of rail lines. The most important carriers include Keihin Kyūkō Electric Railway (Keikyū), Keisei Electric Railway, Keiō Electric Railway, Odakyū Electric Railway, Seibu Railway, Tōbu Railway, and Tōkyū Corporation. In addition to Tokyo's two subway systems — Tokyo Metro and Tokyo Metropolitan Bureau of Transportation (Toei and Toden lines), Yokohama also has two subway lines.

The Tokyo Monorail provides an important shuttle service between Haneda Airport and Hammatsucho station on the Yamanote line.

Others
The Shuto Expressway system connects to other national expressways in the capital region.

Tokyo and Yokohama are major commercial seaports, and both the Japan Maritime Self-Defense Force and United States Navy maintain naval bases at Yokosuka.

See also

Jing-Jin-Ji
List of metropolitan areas in Asia
List of metropolitan areas in Japan
National Capital Region, briefly shows the two definitions of the "Capital Area" (Shuto-ken)
Seoul Capital Area

References

External links
 Urban Employment Areas in Japan (2000)

 
Metropolitan areas of Japan